The 2007 Chinese Taipei Open Grand Prix Gold (officially known as the Yonex Chinese Taipei Grand Prix Gold 2007 for sponsorship reasons) was a badminton tournament which took place in Taipei County, Taiwan from 18 to 23 September 2007. It had a total purse of $170,000.

Tournament 
The 2007 Chinese Taipei Open Grand Prix Gold was the sixth tournament of the 2007 BWF Grand Prix Gold and Grand Prix and also part of the Chinese Taipei Open championships, which had been held since 1980.

Venue 
This international tournament was held at Xinzhuang Gymnasium in Taipei County, Taiwan.

Point distribution 
Below is the point distribution for each phase of the tournament based on the BWF points system for the BWF Grand Prix Gold event.

Prize money 
The total prize money for this tournament was US$170,000. Distribution of prize money was in accordance with BWF regulations.

Men's singles

Seeds 

 Chen Hong (quarter-finals)
 Lee Chong Wei (quarter-finals)
 Peter Gade (third round)
 Sony Dwi Kuncoro (champion)
 Taufik Hidayat (final)
 Boonsak Ponsana (third round)
 Ronald Susilo (first round)
 Shōji Satō (quarter-finals)
 Muhammad Hafiz Hashim (third round)
 Simon Santoso (semi-finals)
 Park Sung-hwan (third round)
 Dicky Palyama (second round)
 Wong Choong Hann (quarter-finals)
 
 Ng Wei (third round)
 Andrew Smith (second round)

Finals

Top half

Section 1

Section 2

Bottom half

Section 3

Section 4

Women's singles

Seeds 

 Wang Chen (champion)
 Pi Hongyan (final)
 Wong Mew Choo (quarter-finals)
 Yao Jie (semi-finals)
 Tine Rasmussen (first round)
 Yip Pui Yin (semi-finals)
 Tracey Hallam (first round)
 Kaori Mori (first round)

Finals

Top half

Section 1

Section 2

Bottom half

Section 3

Section 4

Men's doubles

Seeds 

 Markis Kido / Hendra Setiawan (champions)
 Jung Jae-sung / Lee Yong-dae (quarter-finals)
 Lee Jae-jin / Hwang Ji-man (first round)
 Luluk Hadiyanto / Alvent Yulianto (quarter-finals)
 Shuichi Sakamoto / Shintaro Ikeda (quarter-finals)
 Hendra Aprida Gunawan / Joko Riyadi (semi-finals)
 Lars Paaske / Jonas Rasmussen (final)
 Mohd Zakry Abdul Latif / Mohd Fairuzizuan Mohd Tazari (semi-finals)

Finals

Top half

Section 1

Section 2

Bottom half

Section 3

Section 4

Women's doubles

Seeds 

 Chien Yu-chin / Cheng Wen-hsing (champions)
 Kumiko Ogura / Reiko Shiota (quarter-finals)
 Wong Pei Tty / Chin Eei Hui (semi-finals)
 Jiang Yanmei / Li Yujia (second round)
 Lee Kyung-won / Lee Hyo-jung (semi-finals)
 Endang Nursugianti / Rani Mundiasti (second round)
 Aki Akao / Tomomi Matsuda (first round)
 Miyuki Maeda / Satoko Suetsuna (quarter-finals)

Finals

Top half

Section 1

Section 2

Bottom half

Section 3

Section 4

Mixed doubles

Seeds 

 Nova Widianto / Liliyana Natsir (semi-finals)
 Flandy Limpele / Vita Marissa (champions)
 Sudket Prapakamol / Saralee Thungthongkam (quarter-finals)
 Thomas Laybourn / Kamilla Rytter Juhl (final)
 Han Sang-hoon / Lee Hyo-jung (semi-finals)
 Lee Jae-jin / Hwang Yu-mi (quarter-finals)
 Hendri Saputra / Li Yujia (quarter-finals)
 Devin Lahardi Fitriawan / Lita Nurlita (second round)

Finals

Top half

Section 1

Section 2

Bottom half

Section 3

Section 4

References

External links 
Chinese Taipei Open Grand Prix Gold 2007 Results

Chinese Taipei Open
Chinese Taipei Open
Chinese Taipei Open
Chinese Taipei Open
September 2007 sports events in Asia